Atilio Maccarone (c.1900-1960s) was an Argentine footballer, who played as goalkeeper in the Club Atlético Independiente. He played in the final of 1932, between Independiente and Club Atlético River Plate.

Career 

He made his debut 31 May 1931, playing for Atlanta in the first match against the River Plate, game where his team lost 1–0.

In 1932 Maccarone was summoned by coach Zoilo Canavery as reinforcement for the team of Independiente of Avellaneda.  That same year he played the first final of professional championship against River Plate.

References

External links 
www.estadisticasfutbolargentino.com
www.atlantapasion.com.ar
www.infofutbol.com.ar

Argentine footballers
Footballers from Buenos Aires
Club Atlético Independiente footballers
Club Atlético Atlanta footballers
Argentine people of Italian descent
Association football goalkeepers
Sportspeople from Avellaneda
Río de la Plata